Julian Francis Edelman (born May 22, 1986) is an American former professional football player who was a wide receiver in the National Football League (NFL) for 12 seasons with the New England Patriots. He played college football at Kent State as a quarterback and was selected in the seventh round of the 2009 NFL Draft by the Patriots, where he transitioned to a return specialist and wide receiver. Edelman became a primary offensive starter in 2013 and was a staple of the Patriots' receiving corps until his retirement after the 2020 season.

Although never selected to a Pro Bowl, Edelman was one of the NFL's most productive postseason receivers. He ranks third in postseason receiving yards and receptions and holds the Super Bowl records for punt returns and first-half receptions in a single game. A three-time Super Bowl winner, he was the receiving yards leader during his victories in Super Bowl XLIX and Super Bowl LIII. Edelman was named MVP of the lattermost, where he accounted for more than half his team's receiving yards.

Early years
Edelman was born in the San Francisco Bay Area city of Redwood City, California, to Angela (née Gole) and Frank Edelman, a mechanic who owns A-1 Auto Tech. He has two siblings, Jason and Nicole. Edelman was raised as a Christian  but has experienced what he described as a "Jewish awakening." In an NFL Network interview in December 2013, Edelman said that he was Jewish and celebrated Hanukkah. His mother was born in Kitchener, Ontario, Canada, to German parents who had lived in Belgium.

Edelman played varsity football and baseball at Woodside High School in Woodside, California. He was extremely small as a freshman, weighing under  before his growth spurt. He was the quarterback for his high-school team, and as a senior he led the Wildcats to a 13–0 record in 2004. In high school, Edelman had 2,237 yards and 29 touchdowns passing, and 964 yards and 13 touchdowns rushing.

College career
After high school, Edelman spent a year attending the College of San Mateo. There, he threw for 1,312 yards and 14 touchdowns, rushed for a school-record 1,253 yards and 17 touchdowns. He then transferred to Kent State University, where he majored in business management. At Kent State, Edelman was a three-year starter at quarterback. His senior year, Edelman was the Golden Flashes' leading passer, completing 56% of his passes (153 of 275 passes for 1,820 yards), throwing 13 touchdowns and 11 interceptions. He was also their leading rusher, gaining 1,370 yards on 215 attempts (an average of 6.4 yards per carry) and scoring 13 touchdowns. His total offense broke Joshua Cribbs's single-season school record, set in 2003.

Statistics

Professional career

Edelman was not invited to the 2009 NFL Combine. At his March 12 Pro Day, he ran the short shuttle in 3.92 seconds; the fastest time at the Combine that year was 3.96 seconds.

2009 season
The New England Patriots, who had conducted private workouts with Edelman before the 2009 NFL Draft, selected him with the 27th pick of the seventh round (232nd overall), ahead of Michigan State quarterback Brian Hoyer, who joined the Patriots as a free agent. Several analysts suggested that the Patriots may have selected Edelman for his potential in a Wildcat formation; when the pick was made, he was announced as a wide receiver. On July 16, 2009, Edelman signed a four-year contract with the Patriots that included a $48,700 signing bonus. Edelman later stated that he knew he lacked the ability to make an NFL roster as a quarterback, so before the draft he prepared himself to play at positions other than quarterback. The BC Lions placed Edelman on their "negotiation list," a list of American players for which they have exclusive negotiating rights, and offered him a three-year, incentive-heavy contract to play quarterback.

On August 13, 2009, in a preseason game against the Philadelphia Eagles, Edelman returned a punt 75 yards, and he made the team over former Eagles wide receiver Greg Lewis, for whom the Patriots had given up a fifth-round draft pick in 2009.

Edelman missed the Patriots' Week 1 game against the Buffalo Bills with an ankle injury, but he made his first career start in the Patriots' 16–9 loss in Week 2 against the New York Jets, which was also the first game Wes Welker had missed since becoming a Patriot in 2007. Edelman led all receivers with eight receptions for 98 yards, and added 38 yards on two kickoff returns and 2 yards on a punt return, for a total of 138 all-purpose yards.

Edelman broke his arm in the Patriots' 59–0 rout of the Tennessee Titans, and did not accompany the Patriots on their trip to London to play the Tampa Bay Buccaneers. At the time of his injury, Edelman was leading all rookies with 21 receptions. He returned with the Patriots' Week 10 game against the Indianapolis Colts, where he scored his first official NFL touchdown on a 9-yard reception from Brady.

When Welker was sidelined for the season after tearing two knee ligaments against the Houston Texans, Edelman was again called on to fill Welker's role; Edelman caught 10 of the 15 passes thrown to him for 103 yards, the first 100-yard game of his NFL career. He finished the regular season with 37 receptions for 359 yards and one touchdown. He also made six punt returns as well as 11 kickoff returns, gaining 304 yards in all on 17 returns.

In the Patriots' Wild Card Round playoff loss to the Baltimore Ravens, Edelman caught six passes from Brady for 44 yards, including both of the Patriots' touchdowns. Edelman became the first rookie to score two receiving touchdowns in one postseason game since David Sloan did so for the Detroit Lions in the 1995 season.

2010 season
In the 2010 season, Edelman saw a decrease in playing time; through 15 games, he had four receptions for 14 yards. In the Week 17 game against the Miami Dolphins, with Welker, Deion Branch, and Aaron Hernandez inactive, Edelman capitalized with three receptions for 72 yards and a 94-yard punt return touchdown. It was the first punt return touchdown by a Patriot since Troy Brown returned one against the Carolina Panthers in the Week 17 of the 2001 season, and the longest punt return in Patriots franchise history, eclipsing an 89-yard return by Mike Haynes in 1976.

Edelman set a franchise record by averaging 15.3 yards per return, which was second in the league after the Bears' Devin Hester. For the 2010 season, Edelman played in 15 games with seven receptions for 86 yards and 321 return yards on 21 punt return opportunities. In the Divisional Round against the New York Jets, Edelman had a 12-yard reception in the 28–21 loss.

2011 season: First Super Bowl appearance
During the 2011 season, Edelman was used primarily as a kick and punt returner. During the Patriots' Week 10 game against the New York Jets, because of injuries to the Patriots' secondary, he was pressed into service as a defensive back during the fourth quarter; he earned his first tackle on defense by stopping running back LaDainian Tomlinson on a play in which Tomlinson injured his knee.

During the Patriots' Week 11 game on Monday Night Football against the Kansas City Chiefs, he played defensive back in nickel and dime situations. He also returned a punt 72 yards for a touchdown, which helped him earn his first AFC Special Teams Player of the Week award. In Week 12, he was nominated for the NFL's "Hardest Working Man" for his Week 12 performance against the Philadelphia Eagles, in which he made an open-field tackle on Vince Young to prevent a touchdown. For the 2011 season, Edelman played 13 games with four receptions for 34 yards and 584 return yards on 40 kickoff and punt returns.

In the AFC Championship, on January 22, 2012, against the Baltimore Ravens, Edelman played on 27 of 67 offensive snaps at wide receiver, catching one pass that converted a third down attempt, and 27 of 73 defensive snaps at cornerback, often covering the Ravens' Anquan Boldin; Edelman was credited with a forced fumble on the Ravens' final drive. The Patriots went on to win the AFC Championship, but lost Super Bowl XLVI to the New York Giants. Edelman had three kickoff returns for 73 net return yards in the game.

2012 season
Edelman's snap count increased in the first two games of the 2012 season, including a Week 2 home loss to the Arizona Cardinals in which he started over Wes Welker. After suffering a hand injury in the Patriots' Week 3 loss to the Baltimore Ravens, Edelman was inactive for the next three games. He then saw limited duty until the Patriots' record-tying Week 11 win against the Indianapolis Colts, in which he had one of the best games of his career. Edelman caught five passes for 58 yards and a two-yard touchdown, picked up 47 yards on a single rushing attempt on a reverse play, and returned two punts for a total of 117 yards. The first of those punt returns was a 68-yard punt return for a touchdown, giving Edelman three punt return touchdowns, tying the Patriots franchise mark. Edelman had 105 yards of total offense and 222 all-purpose yards with two touchdowns.

Four days later, on Thanksgiving Day, Edelman scored two more touchdowns in the second quarter of the Patriots' victory over the New York Jets, in which they tied a franchise record with five touchdowns and 35 points in one quarter; he recovered a Jets' fumble and returned it 22 yards on a kickoff return, and then caught a 56-yard touchdown pass from Tom Brady. Although he left early in the third quarter with a head injury, he became the first player since the AFL–NFL merger with both a receiving touchdown and a return touchdown in consecutive games. In a game against the Miami Dolphins on December 2, Edelman broke his right foot and was placed on injured reserve. He missed the remainder of the season. Overall in 2012, Edelman played in nine games with 21 receptions for 235 yards and 301 return yards on 20 kickoff-punt combined return opportunities.

2013 season

Edelman became a free agent after the 2012 season. He re-signed with New England on a one-year deal on April 10, 2013.

In the 2013 season opener, Edelman scored both of New England's touchdowns in their 23–21 win over the Buffalo Bills. He also had three punt returns for a total of 32 yards, which gave him a career total of 75 returns for 975 yards. Edelman became the NFL's all-time leader in career punt return average, with 13.0 yards per return, surpassing the 12.8-yard average of former Chicago Bear George McAfee, although his average dropped below 12.8 shortly afterward.

Edelman had nine catches on 11 attempts for 110 yards and two touchdowns in a historic Week 12 comeback victory at home over the Denver Broncos; the Patriots overcame a 24-point halftime deficit, scored 31 unanswered points, and kicked the winning field goal in the closing minutes of overtime. Edelman outperformed Denver's triplet star wide receivers combined. In Week 17, Edelman became the third Patriots player in team history to catch over 100 passes in a season in the Patriots' 34–20 win over the Buffalo Bills in their second divisional matchup. 2013 became a breakout season for Edelman as he played in all 16 games making 105 receptions for 1,056 receiving yards and 35 punt return opportunities for 374 yards. The Patriots won the AFC East and faced the Indianapolis Colts in the Divisional Round. In the 43–22 victory, he had six receptions for 84 receiving yards. In the AFC Championship against the Denver Broncos, he had 10 receptions for 89 receiving yards in the 26–16 loss.

Edelman became a free agent after the 2013 season. On March 15, 2014, he re-signed with the Patriots on a four-year deal for $17 million.

2014 season: First Super Bowl win
Edelman started 14 games for the Patriots in 2014. He had 92 receptions for 972 receiving yards, as well as four touchdowns. In a Week 9 matchup against the Denver Broncos, Edelman returned a punt 84 yards for his fourth career return touchdown, passing Troy Brown for the most punt return touchdowns in Patriots history. In a Week 14 game against the San Diego Chargers, Edelman caught a pass from Tom Brady then broke two tackles and ran for 69 yards for a touchdown; it was the final touchdown of the game that led the Patriots to a 23–14 win.

The Patriots won the AFC East and returned to the playoffs. Edelman recorded his first NFL touchdown pass on his first NFL pass attempt in the Patriots' Divisional Round game against the Baltimore Ravens. After receiving a lateral pass from Brady, Edelman threw a forward pass to Danny Amendola, who scored a 51-yard touchdown to tie the game at 28–28. In the AFC Championship against the Indianapolis Colts, he had nine receptions for 98 receiving yards in the 45–7 victory.

In Super Bowl XLIX against the Seattle Seahawks, Edelman led all receivers in yardage with 109 yards on nine receptions (teammate Shane Vereen had 11 receptions). His touchdown reception with 2:02 left in the fourth quarter—his only touchdown reception of the postseason—was the final go-ahead score of the game, putting the Patriots up 28–24. For the postseason as a whole, Edelman led all receivers in both receptions (26) and receiving yards (281). He was ranked 91st by his fellow players on the NFL Top 100 Players of 2015.

2015 season
On September 10, Edelman started for the Patriots against the Pittsburgh Steelers in the season-opening game on Thursday Night Football. He led the Patriots in yards and receptions, recording 11 receptions for 97 yards, in the 28–21 victory. In the Patriots' second game of the season against the Buffalo Bills, Edelman got 11 catches, which made it the first time in his career he had back-to-back games with at least 10 catches. Edelman then caught four passes on five targets for 120 yards against the Dallas Cowboys in Week 5.

Against the New York Giants on November 15, Edelman suffered an injury to his fifth metatarsal on his left foot that required him to undergo foot surgery on November 16, 2015. He was expected to be back on the field in six to eight weeks, in time for the playoffs, though that was contingent on the recovery process. Through nine games, Edelman had made 61 catches for 692 yards and seven touchdowns. Edelman returned for the Divisional Round against the Kansas City Chiefs. Edelman had 10 catches for 100 yards to help the Patriots defeat the Chiefs 27–20 and advance to the AFC Championship game for the fifth consecutive year. In the AFC Championship, Edelman had 7 receptions for 53 yards, but the Patriots lost 20–18 to the Denver Broncos. For his efforts in 2015, Edelman was ranked 87th on the NFL Top 100 Players of 2016.

2016 season: Second Super Bowl Championship
On September 15, 2016, Edelman was fined $26,309 for a hit on a defenseless player when he hit linebacker Deone Bucannon helmet-to-helmet. In Week 13, against the Los Angeles Rams, he had eight receptions for 101 yards in the 26–10 victory. In Week 17, Edelman got a block by newcomer wide receiver Michael Floyd on a catch and run that led to a career-long 77-yard touchdown in a 35–14 win over the Miami Dolphins. He finished the game with eight receptions for 151 yards, earning him AFC Offensive Player of the Week. He became the first Patriots wide receiver to receive the award since Randy Moss in 2007. He finished the season with a career-high 1,106 receiving yards on 98 catches. For his efforts in 2017, Edelman was ranked 71st by his peers on the NFL Top 100 Players of 2017.

In the Patriots' Divisional Round victory against the Houston Texans, Edelman caught his 70th postseason pass, breaking Wes Welker's Patriots franchise record. Edelman recorded eight catches for 137 yards in the win as the Patriots reached the AFC Championship Game for an NFL record sixth consecutive season. In the AFC Championship, Edelman caught eight passes for 118 yards in the 36–17 win over the Pittsburgh Steelers. The Patriots advanced to an NFL record ninth Super Bowl appearance.

During Super Bowl LI against the Atlanta Falcons, Edelman made five catches for 87 yards.  The highlight was an unusually difficult catch in the fourth quarter, where the pass was first tipped into the air by cornerback Robert Alford and it appeared that it would fall incomplete, but Edelman and three defenders (Alford, Ricardo Allen, and Keanu Neal) lunged at the ball, and, after it bounced off Alford's leg, Edelman made the reception just inches above the ground. It was ruled a catch on the field and withstood a challenge from Falcons head coach Dan Quinn. NFL Films called the play, which was chosen for the cover of Sports Illustrated, "the greatest catch in Super Bowl history". Edelman's catch sustained a historic comeback for the Patriots, who trailed the Falcons 28–3 late in the third quarter before winning 34–28 in overtime.

2017 season: Missed season due to injury
On June 8, 2017, Edelman signed a two-year, $11 million contract extension with the Patriots, with $9 million guaranteed through the 2019 season. On August 25, in the team's third preseason game against the Detroit Lions, Edelman tore his anterior cruciate ligament (ACL), which prematurely ended his 2017 season. He was placed on injured reserve on September 2, 2017. Without Edelman, the Patriots finished 13–3 and reached Super Bowl LII, where they lost to the Philadelphia Eagles, 41-33.

2018 season: Super Bowl MVP

In February 2018, it was reported that Edelman expected to be ready to play by the 2018 training camp. On June 7, it was announced that Edelman was expected to be suspended for four games due to a violation of the policy against using performance-enhancing drugs. On June 26, Edelman appealed the suspension; on July 3, his appeal was denied. Edelman missed the first four games of the season, and was activated on October 2. He played on Thursday Night Football against the Indianapolis Colts, where he caught seven passes for 57 yards. In Week 8, against the Buffalo Bills, he had nine receptions for 104 yards in the victory on Monday Night Football. In Week 10, in a loss to the Tennessee Titans, he posted nine receptions for 104 yards once again. On December 29, Edelman was fined $63,504 for three personal foul penalties in Week 16. He finished the 2018 season with 74 receptions for 850 receiving yards and six touchdowns. The Patriots finished with an 11–5 record and earned the #2 seed in the AFC in the playoffs.

In the Divisional Round against the Los Angeles Chargers, he had nine receptions for 151 yards in the Patriots' 41–28 victory. In the AFC Championship against the Kansas City Chiefs, he had seven receptions for 96 yards in the 37–31 overtime victory, including two catches on 3rd-and-long situations to keep the eventual game-winning drive in overtime going. In Super Bowl LIII, in a 13–3 victory over the Los Angeles Rams, Edelman caught 10 passes on 12 targets for 141 yards, an effort for which he was named Most Valuable Player (MVP). He became the first wide receiver to win Super Bowl MVP since Santonio Holmes did so in Super Bowl XLIII in 2009. He finished the postseason with 26 receptions for 388 yards, totals high enough to move him into second place all-time in playoff receptions and receiving yards behind Jerry Rice. Edelman is the first Jewish football player to be named Super Bowl MVP.

Edelman's MVP award drew criticism as it came in the same season he was suspended for using an unspecified performance-enhancing substance, although some articles noted that much of the criticism came from baseball writers. The NFL prohibits players suspended for PED use from receiving awards given by the league or the NFL Players' Association. In an interview after the Super Bowl, Edelman apologized, saying, "It'll never happen again."

His performance in the 2018 playoffs has also led to debate about inducting him into the Hall of Fame despite a relative lack of regular season production. He was ranked 90th by his fellow players on the NFL Top 100 Players of 2019.

2019 season

On May 21, 2019, Edelman signed a two-year, $18 million contract extension with the Patriots with $12 million guaranteed, keeping him under contract through the 2021 season. In Week 1 against the Pittsburgh Steelers, Edelman caught six passes for 83 yards and threw one pass for 32 yards in the 33–3 win. In Week 3 against the New York Jets, Edelman caught seven passes for 62 yards and his first receiving touchdown of the season in the 30–14 win. However, he suffered a rib injury in the second quarter that forced him out of the game. Edelman rebounded from his injury in Week 5 against the Washington Redskins; he had eight receptions for 110 yards and a touchdown; he became the first Patriot to record at least 100 yards all season. In Week 6 against the New York Giants, Edelman recorded nine catches for 113 yards in the 35–14 win. In the game, Edelman surpassed Stanley Morgan for the third most receptions in Patriots history. In Week 8 against the Cleveland Browns, Edelman caught eight passes for 78 yards and a season-high two touchdowns in the 27–13 win. In Week 11 against the Philadelphia Eagles, Edelman caught five passes for 53 yards and threw a 15-yard touchdown pass to Phillip Dorsett II in the 17–10 win. In Week 13 against the Houston Texans on Sunday Night Football, Edelman caught six passes for 106 yards and a touchdown during the 28–22 loss. In Week 17 against the Miami Dolphins, Edelman caught three passes for 26 yards during the 27–24 loss.  In the game, Edelman reached 100 catches on the season. He finished the 2019 season with 100 receptions for 1,117 receiving yards and six receiving touchdowns. In the AFC Wild Card Round against the Tennessee Titans, Edelman caught three passes for 30 yards and rushed two times for 12 yards and a touchdown during the 20–13 loss.

2020 season
During Week 2 against the Seattle Seahawks, Edelman finished with eight receptions for a career-high 179 receiving yards as the Patriots lost a close game 30–35 on NBC Sunday Night Football. In Week 6, against the Denver Broncos, he completed two passes in the game on trick plays in the 18–12 loss. Edelman played his final game on October 25, 2020, which was a 33-6 loss to the San Francisco 49ers. Edelman finished the game with one reception for 13 yards. On October 31, 2020, Edelman was placed on injured reserve after undergoing minor knee surgery. He was placed on the reserve/COVID-19 list by the team on November 30, 2020, and moved back to injured reserve on December 10. On December 16, 2020, Edelman was designated to return from injured reserve, opening a 21-day window for the Patriots to put him on the active roster, but head coach Bill Belichick announced on January 1, 2021, that he would not be activated before the end of the season.

Retirement
Edelman announced his retirement on April 12, 2021, after 12 seasons with the Patriots. His retirement occurred after the Patriots ended his contract because he failed a physical. After the announcement, Bill Belichick issued a statement that praised Edelman's competitiveness and mental and physical toughness, calling him the "quintessential throwback player" for his versatile skills, and said that it was a privilege to coach him. Robert Kraft, in his statement, called Edelman "one of the great success stories in our franchise’s history". On social media, Tom Brady wrote about his affection for Edelman as a player and friend, and Cam Newton posted that Edelman would be missed.

After his retirement, Edelman did a series of podcast interviews reviewing his career, including Pardon My Take and Green Light with Chris Long, a teammate of Edelman during the 2016 season. Shortly after retiring from the NFL, he announced that he would start a media career, and would join the cast of Inside the NFL on Paramount+. Speculation immediately emerged that he would later return to the NFL to play with former Patriots quarterback Tom Brady on the Tampa Bay Buccaneers, including a remark by Brady himself; Edelman denied the rumors, saying that he was "a one-team guy".

His retirement also revived the debate about inducting him into the Pro Football Hall of Fame, which had begun after his MVP performance in Super Bowl LIII. Opponents cite his lack of Pro Bowl nominations and other usual metrics for evaluating NFL careers. Proponents cite his roles on three Super Bowl-winning Patriots teams and his ranking second all time in postseason receptions and receiving yards.

NFL career statistics

Regular season

Postseason

Outside football 
In 2016, Edelman became one of three Patriots (along with Malcolm Mitchell and Martellus Bennett) to publish a children's book. Edelman's book, Flying High, is about a squirrel named Jules who learns to overcome his physical limitations through hard work and the assistance of a goat named Tom. A sequel, Flying High 2, loosely based on Edelman's "greatest Super Bowl catch" against the Atlanta Falcons, was released in December 2017.

On October 24, 2017, Hachette Book Group published Edelman's memoir, Relentless, written with Tom E. Curran of NBC Sports Boston.

Edelman has his own clothing brand, JE11. He has worked with Joe's Jeans on a line of shirts and jeans, and with Cutters Sports on a line of football gloves.

He has made cameo appearances on television, including episodes of the HBO sports dramedy Ballers and the reality competition America's Next Top Model. He has also presented twice at the Grammy Awards, in 2015 with teammate Malcolm Butler and in 2019 with teammate Devin McCourty. He appeared in a Puma advertisement campaign in 2015.

With Danny Amendola, he was featured in a 30-minute NFL Network special, NFL Going Global: Edelman & Amendola, chronicling their promotional trip to Mexico City before the Patriots' 2017 game there.

The NFL Network documentary series A Football Life aired an episode about Edelman on November 25, 2022.

Coast Productions 
In 2019, Edelman co-founded a production company, Coast Productions, with ad executive Assaf Swissa. Their first venture was the 2019 Showtime documentary 100%, about Edelman's recovery from a 2017 ACL tear and the 2018 NFL season. In April 2021, after Edelman's retirement, ViacomCBS signed a multi-year development deal with Coast Productions; in the deal, Edelman joined Inside the NFL as an analyst as it moved to Paramount+. Edelman was nominated for a Sports Emmy in 2022 for his first season on Inside the NFL.

Legal problems

Performance enhancing drugs 
As part of his recovery from a devastating ACL injury in 2017; Edelman consumed banned substances to aid his recovery, as he was 32 at the time. Edelman has never discussed openly the nature of the violation that resulted in a four game ban at the beginning of the 2018 season; instead normally categorizing it as adversity he has had to overcome in his struggle to return to the game. His reluctance to accept responsibility and instead fight the ban legally, caused a temporary three month rift with his highly influential father.

Paternity suit 
In July 2016, Edelman was named in a paternity suit filed by Swedish model Ella Rose, with whom he had a casual relationship, naming him as the father of her unborn daughter. After first contesting paternity, Edelman acknowledged it; his daughter was born in November, and he was not named on her birth certificate.

Vandalism 
About 9:00 p.m on January 11, 2020, Edelman was cited for misdemeanor vandalism by Beverly Hills Police Department after he allegedly jumped on the hood of a car in Beverly Hills, California, causing damage. In April 2020, the charge was dropped by the Los Angeles County District Attorney's Office because Edelman had paid the car owner for the repair and had no criminal record.

Personal life
Edelman dated Brazilian model Adriana Lima on and off in 2016 and 2017. He has a daughter Lily, born with Swedish model Ella Rose and in an interview with the magazine Haute Living in 2019, Edelman detailed how challenging and rewarding he found being a father. He explained that fatherhood had changed his view of life.

Edelman's paternal great-grandfather, Harry Edelman, was Jewish; after emigrating from Poland to England, he married Mabel Hennessey, a woman of Irish Catholic background, Julian's great-grandmother. As an adult, Edelman has experienced what he described as a "Jewish awakening." During an NFL Network interview in December 2013, Edelman stated that he identifies as Jewish and celebrates Hanukkah; he has become "more attuned to the religion and history." In 2014 he wore an Israeli-American flag pin on his hat during a game against the Denver Broncos at Gillette Stadium. He also voiced support for the victims of the Pittsburgh synagogue shooting: he wore an Israeli flag hat following the Patriots' win against the Green Bay Packers on November 4, 2018,  and wore a pair of customized cleats bearing the hashtag #strongerthanhate in a game against the Pittsburgh Steelers on December 16, 2018. Edelman shared a photo of the cleats on Instagram and listed the names of all the victims in the photo's caption.

In response to Meyers Leonard's use of an antisemitic slur during a Twitch stream, Edelman posted an open letter inviting Leonard to a Shabbat dinner with him in Miami.

See also
List of select Jewish football players

References

External links

 
 New England Patriots bio

1986 births
Living people
21st-century American Jews
American football quarterbacks
American football return specialists
American football wide receivers
American people of German descent
American people of Polish-Jewish descent
Ed Block Courage Award recipients
Jewish American sportspeople
Kent State Golden Flashes football players
New England Patriots players
People from Foxborough, Massachusetts
People from Redwood City, California
Players of American football from California
San Mateo Bulldogs football players
Sportspeople from Norfolk County, Massachusetts
Sportspeople from the San Francisco Bay Area
Super Bowl MVPs